Hugs and Mugs is a 1950 short subject directed by Jules White starring American slapstick comedy team The Three Stooges (Moe Howard, Larry Fine and Shemp Howard). It is the 121st entry in the series released by Columbia Pictures starring the comedians, who released 190 shorts for the studio between 1934 and 1959.

Plot
After a prison stretch for jewel robbery, three beautiful women search for a pearl necklace the police never found. Unfortunately for them, the warehouse where they hid it was sold for back storage fees to Shangri-La Upholstering Company operated by the Stooges.

As the boys set about the task of fixing and pricing various pieces of furniture, Shemp stumbles upon the necklace and keeps it for himself, despite Larry and Moe dismissing them as a "string of beads." The girls follow the Stooges to their shop, and pretend to flirt with them as a distraction, so they can search the shop for the necklace, resulting in the desecration of a chair. Shemp, convinced that the pearls are fake, tries to give the necklace to the girls, but the molls' gangster ex-boyfriends are hot on their trail and track them down to the shop, demanding the necklace. Slapstick mayhem ensues when the Stooges come to the girls' defense, resulting in a six-man hand-to-hand brawl that ends in a large box full of stuffing.

In the end, Shemp successfully lands blows on the head with an iron to the three gangsters, knocking them out cold. The girls run to their sides and decide there and then to give the pearls back to the rightful owners and disavow their criminal ways.

Cast

Credited

Production notes
Hugs and Mugs was filmed over three days on February 15–17, 1949. It is one of five Stooge films in which a sofa spring becomes attached to someone's backside. This gag was also used in Hoi Polloi, Three Little Sew and Sews, An Ache in Every Stake (Curly's old short films) and Have Rocket, Will Travel (Curly-Joe DeRita's first Feature Film).

External links

References

1950 films
1950 comedy films
The Three Stooges films
American black-and-white films
Films directed by Jules White
Columbia Pictures short films
American comedy films
1950s English-language films
1950s American films